Mihir Kumar Bose (1933–2009) was an Indian geologist and a professor at the Presidency College, Kolkata. He was known for his studies on igneous petrology and was an elected fellow of the Geological Survey of India, Indian National Science Academy, and the Indian Academy of Sciences. The Council of Scientific and Industrial Research, the apex agency of the Government of India for scientific research, awarded him the Shanti Swarup Bhatnagar Prize for Science and Technology, one of the highest Indian science awards for his contributions to Earth, Atmosphere, Ocean and Planetary Sciences in 1976.

Biography 

Born on 1 September 1933 in Kolkata, in the present day Indian state of West Bengal, Mihir Kumar Bose graduated in science (BSc hons) from University of Kolkata and after completing a master's degree from the same institution, he joined Presidency College, Kolkata as a member of faculty at their department of geology in 1956. Simultaneously, he pursued his doctoral studies under the guidance of S. Ray and on securing a PhD in 1965, he did his post-doctoral work at the University of Oslo under Tom F. W. Barth, a renowned petrologist, focusing on petrological-mineralogical research. On his return to India, he resumed his duties at Presidency College and served as the reader of geology and a professor till his superannuation from service in 1993. Post-retirement he continued his researches as an emeritus scientist of the Council of Scientific and Industrial Research and as an honorary scientist of the Indian National Science Academy during (1993–97) and (2001–04) respectively. he died on 1 October 2009, at the age of 76.

Legacy 
Bose was known to have studied the alkaline rocks and anorthosites in India with emphasis on their chemical petrology using 
rock forming minerals collected from different chemical milieus and differing pressure-temperature conditions. His studies assisted in widening the understanding of magmatic differentiation and his use of geochemical criteria for identifying the difference between various ultramafic rocks of Singhbhum region in Jharkhand state as well as his contributions in petrologic nomenclature and classification have been reportedly notable. His researches have been documented as one book, Igneous Petrology and several peer-reviewed articles; the article repository of the Indian Academy of Sciences has listed a number of them. He sat in the subcommission on Systematics and Nomenclature of Igneous Rocks constituted by the International Union of Geological Sciences and the National Committee on Science and Technology of the Government of India. He presided the Geological Mining and Metallurgical Society of India during 2004–06 and served as the vice president of the Indian Association of Geochemists and as an editor of the Indian Journal of Earth Sciences (1972–79).

Awards and honors 
Bose received the National Mineral Award in 1972 and the P. N. Bose Memorial Gold Medal of the Asiatic Society in 2006. In between, the Council of Scientific and Industrial Research awarded him the Shanti Swarup Bhatnagar Prize, one of the highest Indian science awards, in 1976. The Indian National Science Academy elected him as their fellow in 1977 and he became an elected fellow of Indian Academy of Sciences in 1983. He was also a fellow of the Geological Society of India.

Selected bibliography

Books

Articles

See also 
 Igneous petrology

Notes

References

External links 
 

Recipients of the Shanti Swarup Bhatnagar Award in Earth, Atmosphere, Ocean & Planetary Sciences
1933 births
Indian scientific authors
Fellows of the Indian Academy of Sciences
Fellows of the Indian National Science Academy
2009 deaths
Scientists from Kolkata
Bengali scientists
University of Calcutta alumni
20th-century Indian geologists
Academic staff of Presidency University, Kolkata
University of Oslo alumni
Council of Scientific and Industrial Research